Miss Grand Vietnam 2023 will be the second edition of the Miss Grand Vietnam beauty pageant, scheduled to be held in Ho Chi Minh City on August 26, 2023. National finalists qualified through the casting process will compete for the right to represent the country at the Miss Grand International 2023 pageant, which will be held on October 25, also in Ho Chi Minh City.

In addition to the aforementioned international contest, some of the pageant's finalists will also be sent to compete in other international pageants.

Background

Date and venue
The press conference for the Miss Grand Vietnam 2023 pageant was arranged on February 5, 2023, in Ho Chi Minh City, in which the event organizer, Sen Vang Entertainment, stated that this year's edition will consist of five main sub-events, including the Best in Swimsuit Contest, the Vietnam Fashion Festival, the National Costume Contest, the preliminary round, and the grand final coronation. However, the venue for each event was not yet revealed. In the same event, the schedule for the Miss World Vietnam 2023 and a newly established Miss National Vietnam 2023 pageants were also disclosed.

The following is a list of the sub-events of the Miss Grand Vietnam 2023 contest.

Selection of contestants
The national finalists for the pageant will be directly selected by the organizer, no regional pageants were held to determine the province representatives. The primary screening will be done virtually, and the qualified candidates will later face the actual screening and interview in Ho Chi Minh City on July 15 to elect the final candidates.

Pageant

Candidates

References

External links

 

Miss Grand Vietnam
Grand Vietnam 2023
2023 in Vietnam
LÊ HOÀNG PHƯƠNG - MISS GRAND KHÁNH HÒA